"Build" is a song released in November 1987 as the third single from the album The People Who Grinned Themselves to Death by British band The Housemartins. It follows the softer template of the group's later material and reached no. 15 in the UK Singles Chart.

The song is notable amongst the Housemartins catalogue, as it features drummer Dave Hemingway on vocals during the choruses, whilst usual singer Paul Heaton sings the verses and bridge.

The song became a big hit in Brazil due to its inclusion in the telenovela Bebê a Bordo as the theme song for main character Ana.

Charts

References 

The Housemartins songs
1987 songs
1987 singles
Go! Discs singles
Songs written by Paul Heaton
Songs written by Stan Cullimore
Rock ballads